Eupithecia mediocincta is a moth in the family Geometridae. It is found in central China (Gansu, Sichuan).

The wingspan is about 19–21 mm. The fore- and hindwings are reddish brown.

References

Moths described in 2004
mediocincta
Moths of Asia